Windom is an unincorporated community in Wyoming County, West Virginia, United States. Windom was originally known as Darby until November 1899. It was named for former United States Secretary of the Treasury, William Windom.

References

Unincorporated communities in West Virginia
Unincorporated communities in Wyoming County, West Virginia